Hanák (feminine Hanáková) or Hanak is a Czech and Sudeten German surname. The name is also used in Austria, Hungary and Slovakia. Hanak (Czech: Hanakian) is an inhabitant of Hanakia.

Notable people with the surname include:

Andrea Hanak (born 1969), German painter
Anton Hanak (1875–1934), Austrian sculptor
Dušan Hanák (1938), Slovak film director
Jakub Hanák (1983), Slovakian rower
Tomáš Hanák (1957), Czech actor and comedian

See also 
 Hanak

Czech-language surnames
Slavic-language surnames